Note by Note cuisine is a style of cooking based on molecular gastronomy, created by Hervé This. Dishes are made using pure compounds instead of using animal or plant tissues. Hervé This said the cuisine is like "a painter using primary colours, or a musician composing electroacoustic music, wave by  wave, using a computer".

History

According to Hervé This, Note by Note cuisine began in 1994. In the French edition of Scientific American, This wrote that he dreamt of the day when recipes gave advice like "add to your bouillon two drops of a 0.001 percent solution of benzylmercaptan in pure alcohol". This said promoting the cuisine was a struggle, between 1994 and 1999 (he gave the name in 1997) and he got no remuneration out of it (and even today, he is not selling anything, nor products, or machine, or education).  After 2006, he convinced his friend the French chef Pierre Gagnaire to develop Note by Note dishes, and after about one year of work, Pierre Gagnaire served the first Note  by  Note dish ever served in a restaurant. They presented the first Note by Note dish ("Note à note N°1") in Hong Kong 26 April 2008. Then, after more common work, Pierre Gagnaire named the second Note by Note dish called "Chick Corea", after the jazz pianist of the same name.

In 2012, This published La cuisine note à note, where the concept of Note by Note cuisine is discussed. 

Since the proposal of note by note cooking, This succeeded having many places in world to organize Note by Note dinners of events. For example: 
- 2010 : lecture at the meeting of the  Japan Society for the Promotion of Science, in Strasbourg,  in order to invite two Alsatian cooks,  Hubert Maetz and Aline Kuntz, to make two note by note dishes, that they did in front of the audience.

- 2010 : at the Institute for Advanced Studies in Gastronomy, note by note educational dinner at the Ecole du Corbon bleu, in Paris. The chefs were Patrick Terrien, Patrick Caals, Frédéric Lesourd, Bruno Stril, Philippe Clergue, Marc Thivet, Franck Poupard, Patrick Lebouc, Jean-François Deguignet, Jean-Jacques Tranchant, Nicolas Bernardé (MOF), and Xavier Cotte. And the menu was the following: 
Royale de sous bois, blanc-manger truffé et bouillon légèrement mousseux
Profondeur iodée de poulpe et Saint-Pierre, écume et transparence de spaghettis aux cèpes
Pigeonneau en deux cuissons, sa compotée de cuisses, potimarron fondant, gelée aux polyphénols, asperges virtuelles
Mille-feuille de chèvre frais au siphon
Guimauve en deux textures
Ardoise « This »
Sucrette glacée au parfum de Menton

- 2011 : for the International Year of Chemistry, the official partner was the  Dow Chemicals Company, who accepted to fund a note by note banquet, the day before the official opening at  UNESCO, in Paris : the 26 th of January, the team of the catering company  Potel & Chabot, under the direction of the chef  Jean-Pierre Biffi, served a menu of  : 
Sur une idée d'huitres : huitres de tapioca, bavarois d'amylopectine, tapioca de citron vert, eau de mer gelée, crème d'huitres, vapeur cristallisée
Soufflé au homard, sauce wöhler et gelée de framboises
Fibres de bœuf, capellini, cylindres orange
Boule de cassis
This menu was also served at the Michelin Star Ceremony organized by the journal L'Hôtellerie-Restauration, the same year in Paris. 

- October 2011, another note by note dinner was served by the chefs-teachers of the Cordon bleu School, in Paris. The chefs were  Patrick Terrien, Patrick Caals, Philippe Clergue, Frédéric Lesourd, Patrick Lebouc, Franck Poupard, Bruno Stril and Marc Thivet,  Jean-François Deguignet, Xavier Cotte, Nicolas Jordan and Jean-Jacques Tranchant, and the menu was: 
Mille feuilles terre et mer trois couleurs, souligné des deux sauces Kientzheim et crustacés
Recherche note à note en pot-au-feu
Reconstitution d'une mozzarella, huile d'olive et mâche
Le dessert Cordon bleu

- November 2011 : the Association  Toques blanches internationales was doing his first « Workshop innovation »,  on note by note cooking  :  Jean-Pierre Lepeltier (Hôtel Renaissance La Défense, Paris), David Desplanques (Hôtel Crowne Plazza République, Paris), Michael Foubert (Hôtel Renaissance Arc de Triomphe), Marie Soyez (Hôtel Renaissance La Défense, Paris), David Crenn (Hôtel Renaissance La Défense, Paris), Vincent Vitasse (Hôtel Concorde Lafayette, Paris), Julien Mercier (Hôtel Pullmann Bercy, Paris) were experimenting, after some products were shown. 

- December 2011 : This workshop led, this same year in December, on culinary courses given by the chefs of the same Association, during the raise funding event  Téléthon:  Jean-Pierre Lepeltier (Hôtel Renaissance La Défense, Paris), David Desplanques (Hôtel Crowne Plazza République, Paris), Michael Foubert (Hôtel Renaissance Arc de Triomphe), Marie Soyez (Hôtel Renaissance La Défense, Paris), David Crenn (Hôtel Renaissance La Défense, Paris), Vincent Vitasse (Hôtel Concorde Lafayette, Paris), Julien Mercier (Hôtel Pullmann Bercy, Paris) were educating public that had paid for the courses and taste the dishes. 

- April 2012, a series of lectures and press conferences were organized at the  Institut du Tourisme et d'Hôtellerie du Québec (ITHQ), in Montreal. For the first press conference, the chef Ismael Osorio and the scientist Erik Ayala Bribiesca,  along with chefs and students of  ITHQ, served four bouchées note by note to about  150 journalists. 
The next day, a note by note meal that was less  « art moderne » was served to international journalists, with comments. 

- 2012  was also the year in which the public and free Courses on molecular gastronomy discussed note by note cooking. During three podcasted days of lectures, chefs were invited : Philippe Clergue, from le Cordon bleu, and  Jean Pierre Lepeltier, the president of the Toques blanches internationales. The courses are on line on the internet site of AgroParisTech  http://www2.agroparistech.fr/podcast/-Cours-2012-La-cuisine-note-a-note-.html

- July 2012 :  at Euroscience Open Forum, Dublin, Ireland, a lecture by Hervé This was followed by the production of note by note food samples by the chef David Desplanques. 

-August 2012 :  note by note cooking was shown to the students of the Eramus Mundus Master Program Food Innovation and Product Design, at AgroParisTech, Paris. The chef Jean-Pierre Lepeltier (Hôtel Renaissance La Défense, Paris) came to show new note by note dishes. 

Later, there are too many things, such as a new workshop of the  Toques blanches internationales, in August 2012, a press conference with demonstrations when the book "La cuisine note à note en 12 questions souriantes" was shown to the press, with dishes prepared by  chefs  Jean-Pierre Lepeltier, chef Hôtel Renaissance Paris La Défense, Laurent Renouf, sous chef  Hôtel Renaissance Paris La Défense, Julien Lasry, chef de partie Hôtel Renaissance Paris La Défense, Marie Soyer, chef de partie Hôtel Renaissance Paris La Défense, Mickael Foubert, chef Hôtel Renaissance Arc de Triomphe, Lucille Bouche, sous chef Hôtel Renaissance Le parc Trocadéro, Yannick Jaouen (sous-chef Hôtel Mariott Rive Gauche Paris)

- In 2013, the first International Contest for Note by Note Cooking took place in Paris.  Pierre Gagnaire came and showed the dish named « Chick Corea », that was previously shown at the Book Fair of Paris, some weeks earlier. 
Now, the Contest is having its seventh event, after : 
- 2014 : using methional
- 2015,  playing with proteins, octenol
- 2016, using cellulose and trigeminal compounds
- 2017, fibrous consistencies and acidities
- 2018  : crackling

In July 2013 the Company Mane produced a box of about 20 compounds that was offered to some French chefs, allowing training chefs in the restaurant of Akrame, then at the  Plaza Athénée. 

Since, all went faster, with about  200 lectures per year, all over the world, showing note by note cooking. 
Some items only:  
- in Denmark, in   2014,the University of Aarhus and chefs produced a note by note meal served to the king family. 
- in Estoril, Portugal, in Boston and New York, in some French culinary schools, as well, note by note cooking is taught.
- in Japan, 2015, a collaboration of the  Corbon bleu and  Ritsumekan University led to showing note by note sushis to the press, by the  chef Guillaume Siegler. 
Then, in  2015, when a journalist of the  New York Times came to  Paris in order to make a piece on note by note cooking, the chef Pierre Gagnaire accepted to make  a whole menu in which all dishes were based on one single odorant compound.  The menu was :
Amuses bouche
1-cis-hexen-3-ol
gaïacol et 2,4,6-triisobutyl-5-dihydro-4H-1,3,5-dithiazine
2-acétylthiazole
acétyl méthyl carbinol acétyl propionyl
pipérine
Chick Corea
benzaldéhyde

Now, the most important : 
- in 2016, a lecture at the World Chefs Association, in Thessaloniki
- in 2017, a company was created by a young French entrepreneur to sell note by note compounds. 
- in May 2017, the chef Andrea Camastra moved to full Note by Note, in his restaurant Senses, in Warsaw, Poland
- in February 2018, a  100 % Note by Note Dinner served by the Alsatian chef Julien Binz (Michelin Star), in Ammerschwihr, Alsace (France)
- in  April 2018, a Note by Note Dinner at the Culinary School Le Monde, Athens, Greece
- in July 2018, two Note by Note Dinners served by chefs of the At-Sunrice Global Chef Academy, in Singapore, to Ministers, Ambassadors and other distinguished guests

Now,  note by note  is regularly taught in some universities, including AgroParisTech and the Dublin Institute of Technology, whereas the International contest goes on every year at AgroParisTech.

Preparation
Ingredients used in Note by Note cuisine are called compounds, which include water, ethanol, sucrose, protein, amino acids and lipids. For example, in the "wölher sauce" made by Note by Note cuisine, the following might be added: water, anthocyanins (for colour), sugars, ethanol, amino acids (for flavour), glycerol, phenols, quinones, and organic acids.

References

Further reading

Cuisine
Molecular gastronomy